Ethelred Jean Straker (20 April 1913 – 1984), generally known as Jean Straker, was a British photographer and campaigner against censorship.

Born in London, to a Russian émigré father, his mother was an English ballerina. After leaving school he went to work in a film publicity office. Turning freelance, he ghosted articles for film and theatre magazines, which he illustrated with his own photographs.

During the Second World War he was a conscientious objector, but he combined his duties as an Air Raid Precautions (ARP) Warden with that of a surgical photographer for the Ministry of Information.

He bought a studio in Soho Square in 1945  and set up a firm called the Photo Union. He liked to experiment with colour photography, but this proved expensive. He also quickly bored of having to deal with clients. This motivated him in 1951 to turn his studio into the Visual Arts Club, the aim of which was to allow him, through lectures and demonstrations, to pass on his ideas to others as well as to provide nude models for amateur photographers. Straker came up with the term “appraisers” for those who just wanted to watch and learn. Life drawing classes were also a major part of the club.

The club would often take part in London's Soho Fair with a float of their own and an exhibition called Femina. In 1961 the name of the club changed to The Academy of Visual Arts.

On 22 May 1958 the BBC Third Programme broadcast a discussion on Pin-ups and Figure Studies with Jean Straker and fellow photographers Jack Eston and Walter Bird.

The passing of the 1959 Obscene Publications Act in 1959 resulted in a continuous cycle of prosecutions and appeals as Straker refused to compromise his artistic integrity. He became instrumental in changes to the censorship laws of the United Kingdom in the 1960s.

After nearly a decade of litigation, he retired to Sussex. He died in 1984.

Books
The Nudes of Jean Straker, Charles Skilton, London. 1958

See also
 Artistic freedom
 Freedom of information
 Freedom of speech

References

Byron Rogers, On the Trail of the Last Human Cannonball and Other Small Journeys in Search of Great Men (Aurum Press, 2007)

1913 births
1984 deaths
English people of Russian descent
Photographers from London
British conscientious objectors
British erotic photographers
Censorship in the United Kingdom